Procera Music, is the largest Record label in Fiji, headquartered in Suva, it is one of the biggest recording and music distribution companies in the South Pacific region. Procera Music was founded by Mohammed Akif and it is well known for releasing Kirtan, Bhajan, Qawwali, Fijian, English and Gospel music.

Procera Music Awards
Every year Procera Music hosts its own music festival and music awards to honour achievements by fiji's music artists.

2012 Procera Music Awards
 Top Artist Vude: Malumu ni Tobu kei Naivaukura

2014 Procera Music Awards
 Top Artist Vude: Malumu ni Tobu kei Naivaukura
 Best Stage Entertainer: Malumu ni Tobu kei Naivaukura

2015 Procera Music Awards
 Special Recognition Award iTaukei: Simione Cabelevu (Domoni Savu),  Inoke Kalounisiga & Uate Tui Ravai
 Special Recognition Award Hindi: Salen Prasad Pinky & Umeh Chand
 Life Time Award Achievement Award: Bill Beddoes
 Best Composer: Marika Vaniqi (Sea Domoni)
 Best Music Programmer: Adriu Saranuku
 Best stage entertainer: Jiosefa Veitakula of Malumu ni Tobu kei Naivaukura
 Top Choir Song: Ovea Church Choir
 Top Gospel Group: Theophilus
 Top Filmy Artist: DJ Pranil
 Top Lokgeet Artist: Mrs Madhu Lata
 Top Tamil Kirtan Artist: Mr Kaushal Mani
 Legend Award: Ashok Kumar
 Top Sigidrigi Artist: Waikoula kei Tavua
 Top Kirtan Artist Award: Avinesh Chand
 Top Bhajan Artist: Ahmol Chand, Shui Dayal
 Top Vude Artist: Jale Mareau

2016 Procera Music Awards
 Special recognition awards iTaukei: Iliesa Baravilala and Vili Tuiaucala
 Special recognition award Hindi: Shiu Dayal
 Best recording engineer: Waisea Rogoyawal
 Best iTaukei composer: Apolosi Baravi - For Nasi Dredre
 Best stage entertainer award: Malumu ni Tobu kei Naivaukura
 Young talent awards: Kartik Pillay, Monish Kumar and Shanaal Nand
 Top artist qawali: Khalid Hussein
 Top Artist Filmy - Sunny Boy
 Top artist Pachara - Salend Prasad (Pinky)
 Bula Fm Award For Best Group - Malumu ni Tobu kei Naivaukura
 Radio Fiji Two Young Lokgeet Artist - Shelin Kumar (Nadro Princess)
 Top Tamil Kirtan Artist - Mr. Shivneel Raj (Shiv Shekar)
 Top Artist Lokgeet - Mrs Madhu Lata Pratap
 Top Artist Gospel - 3rd Covenant
 Legend Award - Mr Shiu Balak
 Top Artist Kirtan - Nitin Nilesh Prakash & Avinesh Chand
 Top Artist Sigidrigi - Drodrolagi Kei Nautosolo 
 Top artist Vude - Voqa Kei Valenisau
 Top Artist Bhajan - Mr Ashok Kumar

2017 Procera Music Awards
 Special Recognition Award (Hindi) - Umesh Sharma (Bhajan Artist from Sigatoka)
 Special Recognition Award (i-Taukei) - Dr Jone Senibici (Gospel Artist based in Canada)
 New Talent (Hindi) - Shamal Divnesh (Kirtan Artist from Labasa)
 New Talent (i-Taukei) - Mosese Baledrokadroka (Child artist from Lautoka)
 Best Composer - Josefa Levu
 Best Gospel Artist/Group - Third Covenant
 Best Recording Engineer - Adriu Saranuku
 Best Tamil Kirtan Artist - Shiv Shekar
 Best Pachra Artist - Shalen Prasad Pinky (Tavua)
 Best Stage Entertainer (i-Taukei) - Suliasi Uluilakeba
 Best Stage Entertainer (Hindi/Bhajan) - Anmol Chand (Nadi)
 Best Critic Award Vude (i-Taukei) - Kerry Damudamu
 Best Lokgeet Award - Madhu Lata (Labasa) and Sheleen Chand (Nadroga)
 Best Kirtan Artist - Nitin Nilesh Prakash (Labasa)
 Best Sigidrigi Award - Drodrolagi Kei Na Utosolo
 Best Bhajan Artist - Ajesh Ramjesh (Navua)
 Best Vude Artist - Savu Ni Delai Lomai

See also
 Malumu ni Tobu kei Naivaukura

References

External links
 Facebook Page

Record label distributors
Fijian independent record labels
World music record labels